Charles Vivian John McInnes (21 August 1916 – 3 December 1992) was an Australian rules footballer who played with Carlton in the VFL.

A follower and half forward flanker, McInnes played many of his 118 games at Carlton as their 19th man. It was in that role that he played in Carlton's 1938 and 1945 premierships.

During his football career McInnes enlisted in the Australian Army to serve in World War II, serving for 16 months within Victoria.

References

Blueseum page for Charlie McInnes
 

1916 births
1992 deaths
Australian rules footballers from Victoria (Australia)
Carlton Football Club players
Carlton Football Club Premiership players
Two-time VFL/AFL Premiership players